The 2012 WGC-Accenture Match Play Championship was a golf tournament played February  at the Ritz-Carlton Golf Club at Dove Mountain in Marana, Arizona, northwest of Tucson. It was the 14th WGC-Accenture Match Play Championship and the first of four World Golf Championships held in 2012.

Hunter Mahan won his first Match Play title and second WGC with a 2&1 victory over runner-up Rory McIlroy. Defending champion Luke Donald lost in the first round, as did three other previous winners.

Format change
For 2012, the players were seeded based on the last Official World Golf Ranking prior to the tournament, instead of the previous weeks ranking that determined the field.

Past champions in the field

2012 course layout

 The championship utilized the Saguaro and Tortolita nines; the course rating was 77.1 and the slope was 147.
 The only yardage change from 2011 was the lengthening of the 11th hole, from 601 to 659 yards.

Brackets
The championship was a single elimination match play event. The field consisted of the top 64 players available from the Official World Golf Ranking as of the February 12 ranking, seeded according to the February 19 rankings. 

Two players ranked in the top 64 did not play in the event. Phil Mickelson (ranked #11) did not play due to a planned family vacation and was replaced by Ernie Els (#65). Paul Casey (#23) did not play due to a shoulder injury and was replaced by George Coetzee (#66). In the first round, Els handily defeated defending champion Luke Donald 5&4 and Coetzee took Rory McIlroy to 18th hole, but fell at 2 down.

Bobby Jones bracket

Ben Hogan bracket

Gary Player bracket

Sam Snead bracket

Final Four

Breakdown by country

Prize money breakdown

 Source:

References

External links
Official site

WGC Match Play
Golf in Arizona
WGC-Accenture Match Play Championship
WGC-Accenture Match Play Championship
WGC-Accenture Match Play Championship